Kléber was an express train that linked Strasbourg and Paris, France, between 1971 and 1988.  It was a first-class-only Trans Europ Express (TEE) operated by the Société Nationale des Chemins de fer français (SNCF).

The train was named after Jean Baptiste Kléber, a Strasbourg-born French general during the French Revolutionary Wars.

Route
The Kléber'''s route was the  Paris–Strasbourg railway, with just the following stops:
 Strasbourg-Ville – Nancy-Ville – Paris-Est

History
The Kléber was introduced on 23 May 1971.  Initially, it departed from Strasbourg as TEE 60 at 07:50 and arrived in Paris at 11:40.  The return train, TEE 61, left Paris at 17:20 and reached Strasbourg at 21:10.

Between the Winter 1973/74 timetable and its 1980/81 counterpart, the train ran 15 minutes later in each direction.

On 26 September 1982, the morning TEE 60 service was discontinued.  Its name was transferred to the evening TEE 62 Strasbourg–Paris service, which had previously been the TEE Stanislas.  The latter became the Rapide Stanislas, keeping its same late morning departure time from Paris and taking over Kléber morning schedule from Strasbourg.

The TEE 62, now renamed Kléber (ex-TEE Stanislas), continued to leave Strasbourg at 17:10 and arrive in Paris at 21:00.

The TEE 62 / TEE 61 ceased to exist as separate trains on 23 September 1988, when they were integrated into an international train between Paris and Stuttgart Hbf in Stuttgart, Germany.

Formation (consist)
The Kléber was hauled by the SNCF Class BB 15000, a class of 25 kV 50 Hz AC electric locomotives.

Its inaugural formation of rolling stock was a rake of SNCF  painted in a distinctive red, orange, light grey and slate grey livery.

Originally, the coaches were arranged as an A4Dtux, two A6u, three A8tu, an Vru and an A3rtu.  On 28 September 1975, the train was lengthened to a total of 13 coaches.

Due to the limited availability of the Grand Confort coaches, they were occasionally replaced by Mistral 56-type . In 1982, the train's formation was changed to Mistral 69-type DEV Inoxes. 

Throughout the Kléber existence, its restaurant car was staffed by the Compagnie Internationale des Wagons-Lits'' (CIWL).

See also

 History of rail transport in France
 List of named passenger trains of Europe

References

Notes

Bibliography
 
 
 

Named passenger trains of France
Trans Europ Express
Railway services introduced in 1971